Card check, also called majority sign-up, is a method for employees to organize into a labor union in which a majority of employees in a bargaining unit sign authorization forms, or "cards", stating they wish to be represented by the union. Since the National Labor Relations Act (NLRA) became law in 1935, card check has been an alternative to the National Labor Relations Board's (NLRB) election process. Card check and election are both overseen by the National Labor Relations Board. The difference is that with card sign-up, employees sign authorization cards stating they want a union, the cards are submitted to the NLRB and if more than 50% of the employees submitted cards, the NLRB requires the employer to recognize the union. The NLRA election process is an additional step with the NLRB conducting a secret ballot election after authorization cards are submitted. In both cases the employer never sees the authorization cards or any information that would disclose how individual employees voted.

Current and proposed law 
The current method for workers to form a union in a particular workplace in the United States is a sign-up, and then an election process. In that, a petition or an authorization card with the signatures of at least 30% of the employees requesting a union is submitted to the National Labor Relations Board (NLRB), who then verifies and orders a secret ballot election. Two exceptions exist. If over 50% of the employees sign an authorization card requesting a union, the employer can voluntarily choose to waive the secret ballot election process and just recognize the union. The other exception is a last resort, which allows the NLRB to order an employer to recognize a union if over 50% have signed cards if the employer has engaged in unfair labor practices that make a fair election unlikely.

Under the proposed Employee Free Choice Act (EFCA),  if the NLRB verifies that over 50% of the employees signed authorization cards, the secret ballot election is bypassed and a union is automatically formed. Introduced in the U.S. Congress in 2005 and reintroduced in 2007 and 2009, the EFCA provides that the NLRB would recognize the union's role as the official bargaining representative if a majority of employees have authorized that representation via card check, without requiring a secret ballot election. Under the EFCA, if over 30% and fewer than 50% of employees sign a petition or authorization cards, the NLRB would still order a secret ballot election for union representation.

History 
Card check is not new. Since the National Labor Relations Act of 1935 was passed, it has been legal for workers to form a union when a majority of employees in a bargaining unit sign cards indicating their intent to bargain collectively with the employer. The National Labor Relations Board in its early days "certified on the record when there had been an agreement with the employer for card-check" ... "in the final year before the Taft-Hartley Act was passed [in 1947], 646 representation petitions were informally resolved through the card-check procedure".

In 1949, the NLRB's Joy Silk doctrine established that "an employer could lawfully refuse to bargain with a union claiming representative status through possession of authorization cards only if he had a 'good faith doubt' as to the union's majority status."

In 1969, Chief Justice Earl Warren delivered the majority opinion for the U.S. Supreme Court that upheld the use of card check. Warren stated, "Almost from the inception of the Act, then, it was recognized that a union did not have to be certified as the winner of a Board election to invoke a bargaining obligation; it could establish majority status by other means... by showing convincing support, for instance, by a union-called strike or strike vote, or, as here, by possession of cards signed by a majority of the employees authorizing the union to represent them for collective bargaining purposes." NLRB v. Gissel Packing Co., (1969). The Supreme Court has consistently ruled in favor of card check, and Warren cited prior affirmations in NLRB v. Bradford Dyeing Assn., (1940); Franks Bros. Co. v. NLRB, (1944); United Mine Workers v. Arkansas Flooring Co., (1956).

Support 
Supporters of card check argue that it makes it easier for workers to join unions. For example, in his remarks accompanying the introduction of the Employee Free Choice Act, Rep. George Miller (D-Calif.),  former chairman of the U.S. House Committee on Education and Labor, described the limitations of the system of NLRB elections:

Barack Obama supported the bill. An original co-sponsor of the Employee Free Choice Act, then-Sen. Obama urged his colleagues to pass the bill during a 2007 motion to proceed:

The AFL–CIO stated the following in arguing that the company-controlled secret ballots actually make the process less democratic:

Opposition 
Those who oppose card check argue it strips workers of their right to a secret ballot. They also argue that even though gathering a majority of card signers might imply that a secret ballot would be unnecessary, signers could be coerced to sign through intimidation and pressure; the same could also be said of employers in the period between sign-up and a secret ballot. Many business organizations, including The U.S. Chamber of Commerce, opposed the implementation of card check. From its website:

The National Restaurant Association lists three points in opposition to card check on its website.

Investor Warren Buffett stated his opposition to card check in a 2009 CNBC interview: "I think the secret ballot's pretty important in the country. I'm against card check, to make a perfectly flat statement."

Representative John Kline, R-Minn., in explaining his opposition to the EFCA:

Forbes commentator Brett Joshpe states his opposition to card check as such:

According to a 2004 Zogby survey conducted for the Michigan-based pro-free market, anti-union Mackinac Center for Public Policy, when asked if they wished to keep the current voting process or replace it with one "less private", 78% of union members support keeping the current secret ballot system to one "less private".
As noted above, in both card check and NLRB secret elections, employers never see authorization cards or identifying information of how an employee voted, though in card check unions would see how an employee voted.

References

External links 
Coalition for a Democratic Workplace
Dr. Gordon Lafer. "Neither Free nor Fair: The Subversion of Democracy under NLRB Elections".
John Logan, "The Union Avoidance Industry in the United States".
John Logan, "Consultants, Lawyers, and the 'Union-Free' Movement in the USA since the 1970s".
American Rights at Work Fact Sheet: Majority Sign-up Q&A
Employee Free Choice Act Now!
Employee Free Choice Act Updates
Workers Reject Card Checks, Favor Private Ballots in Union Organizing

United States labor law
National Labor Relations Board
Labor relations in the United States